P3000 may stand for:

 HD Graphics P3000, integrated graphics processor
 HP LaserJet P3000 series of laser printers
 Huayun HY-P3000, a Chinese micro air vehicle
 Early prototype of the Heckler & Koch P30